AMAP is a  multiple sequence alignment program based on sequence annealing. This approach consists of building up the multiple alignment one match at a time, thereby circumventing many of the problems of progressive alignment. The AMAP parameters can be used to tune the sensivitiy-specificity tradeoff.

The program can be used through the AMAP web server or as a standalone program which can be installed with the source code.

Input/Output 

This program accepts sequences in FASTA format.

The output format includes: FASTA format, Clustal.

References

External links 
 AMAP web server

Bioinformatics software